Piotr Głowacki (born 29 March 1980) is a Polish actor. He appeared in more than sixty films since 2004. Awarded with the most prestigious prize for a young actor of his generation in 2014, Głowacki has since played in major Polish and international movies. 

He is married to Agnieszka Głowacka and has two children, Ida and Aaron.

Selected filmography

References

External links 

1980 births
Living people
Polish male film actors